Peter Bruce Pauling Whitbread (25 October 1928 – 26 October 2004) was an English actor and screenwriter.

He was born in Norfolk, England and educated at Gresham's School, Holt, Norfolk.

He had a long career in the theatre, including several seasons with the New Shakespeare Company. In his later years he devised and performed one-man shows.

Beyond acting, Whitehead worked as a director, playwright and screenwriter. He concentrated mostly on writing for the theatre, and in 1974 his drama Mr Axelford’s Angel won the Emmy Award for Best Television Play. He also wrote scripts for the television soap opera Emmerdale Farm, and all the episodes of Southern Television children's series The Flockton Flyer.

He died after a road accident near his home at Briningham, near Melton Constable, Norfolk.

Filmography as actor

Troilus & Cressida (1981) - Calchas
Swallows and Amazons Forever!: Coot Club (1984) - Rodley
The Burston Rebellion (1985) - Noah Sandy
Paris by Night (1988) - English Lecturer
Heritage Africa (1989) - Sir Robert Guggiswood

References

External links
 

1928 births
2004 deaths
Road incident deaths in England
People from Holt, Norfolk
People educated at Gresham's School
English soap opera writers
English male stage actors
English male film actors
British male television writers
20th-century English screenwriters
20th-century English male writers
People from North Norfolk (district)